Clayton Vance Heafner Jr. (August 11, 1954 – September 26, 2012) was an American professional golfer who played on the PGA Tour, the Nationwide Tour and the Champions Tour.

Early life 
Heafner was born in Charlotte, North Carolina. He was the son of professional golfer Clayton Heafner and Mary Ellen Allen. 

The family moved to Cary, North Carolina where he attended Cary Elementary School and Cary High School. 

He attended North Carolina State University and was a three-time All-American member of the golf team. Heafner played on the 1977 Walker Cup team, winning all three of his matches to help lead the U.S. to victory, and turned professional in 1978.

Career 
Heafner played in 266 events on the PGA Tour from 1978–1988, making the cut 157 times. He had 20 top-10 finishes including a win at the 1981 Walt Disney World National Team Championship with playing partner Mike Holland.

Heafner played some on the Nationwide Tour toward the end of his regular career years. His best finish in that venue is a T-14 at the 1994 NIKE Carolina Classic. After reaching the age of 50 in August 2004, he began to play on the Champions Tour in selected events. His best finish was a T-34 at the 2006 SAS Championship.

Heafner resided in North Carolina; he was Director of Golf at the Prestonwood Country Club in Cary, and most recently a teaching pro at Wildwood Golf Club in Raleigh.

Amateur wins
1976 Eastern Amateur
1977 Azalea Invitational, Porter Cup, North Carolina Amater
1978 Eastern Amateur

Professional wins (2)

PGA Tour wins (1)

Other wins (1)
this list may be incomplete
1974 Carolinas Open (as an amateur)

Results in major championships

Note: Heafner never played in The Open Championship.

CUT = missed the half-way cut
"T" indicates a tie for a place

U.S. national team appearances
Walker Cup: 1977 (winners)

See also
Spring 1980 PGA Tour Qualifying School graduates
1986 PGA Tour Qualifying School graduates

References

External links

American male golfers
NC State Wolfpack men's golfers
PGA Tour golfers
PGA Tour Champions golfers
Golfers from Charlotte, North Carolina
People from Cary, North Carolina
1954 births
2012 deaths